The Arizona Wildcats football program is a college football team representing the University of Arizona that is a member of the Pac-12 Conference. The team has had 30 head coaches and two interim head coaches since its founding in 1899. The Wildcats have played in more than 1,100 games in 113 seasons. Arizona's current head coach is Jedd Fisch, who was hired after the 2020 season concluded.

Eight coaches have led Arizona in postseason bowl games: Pop McKale, Mike Casteel, Darrell Mudra, Tony Mason, Larry Smith, Dick Tomey, Mike Stoops, and Rich Rodriguez. Four of those coaches also won conference championships: Tex Oliver captured two and Casteel one as a member of the Border Conference; and LaRue and Young captured one as a member of the Western Athletic Conference.

McKale is the leader in seasons coached with sixteen. Tomey is the leader in games won with 90. Leslie Gillett is the leader in winning percentage with a perfect 1.00. Mike Hankwitz has the lowest winning percentage of those who have coached more than one game, with 	0.143. Of the 14 different head coaches who have led the Wildcats, Mudra has been inducted into the College Football Hall of Fame.

Key

Coaches

Statistical leaders 
Updated as of November 26, 2022 

Most overall wins 

Most Pac-12 wins 

Highest overall winning percentage 

Highest Pac-12 winning percentage 

 

Lowest overall winning percentage 

Lowest Pac-12 winning percentage 

Pac-12 championships 

National championships

Notes

References 
General
 
 

Arizona

Arizona sports-related lists